Jachmann is a German surname.

In its Silesian mode, the name Jach can be traced to the Bohemian and Moravian variants of the Czech shorthand form Jach(a) of the given name Johannes. It was first mentioned 1377 in Prague as Johannes alias Jacha.

In its Polish mode, the name was first mentioned in the 14th century: 1326 Iach molendinator, 1437 Johannem dictum Jach, 1440 Iaskone alias Iach and 1452 Iach de Vilczouicze.

According to this, the surname Jachmann and the similar Jochmann can be seen as patronymic names.

Variants
 Jach
 Jache
 Jachan
 Joch
 Jochmann

People

Jachmann
 Alfred Jachmann (1829–1918), German public officer and banker
 Eduard von Jachmann (1822-1887), the first vice admiral of the Prussian Navy
 Johanna Jachmann-Wagner (1828-1894), mezzo-soprano singer, tragédienne, and teacher of singing and theatrical performance
 Reinhold Bernhard Jachmann (1767-1843), German theologian and educator

Jochmann
 Georg Jochmann (1874-1915), German internist and bacteriologist
 Hansi Jochmann (born 1953), German actress
 Jakob Jochmann (born 1993), Austrian handball player
 Rosa Jochmann (1901-1994), Austrian resistance activist and Ravensbrück survivor and later politician
 Werner Jochmann (1921-1994), German historian and director of the Research Centre for the History of National Socialism

Notes

Jewish surnames